'Valley of the Wolves' is a Turkish television drama that originally aired on Show TV. The show was subsequently acquired by Kanal D for its final season.

The show focuses on the protagonist Agent Polat Alemdar, an undercover operative who joins the mafia and becomes the partner of a known mafia gunman, Süleyman Çakır. The show makes direct and indirect references to Turkish politics.

Valley of the Wolves became the most successful TV show in Turkey. Multiple successful feature films were made based on the show, including Valley of the Wolves: Iraq, Valley of the Wolves: Gladio and Valley of the Wolves: Palestine.

Cast

Main characters

Council of the Wolves

References

External links
 Official website

 Turkish drama television series
 Television series about organized crime
2000s Turkish television series
2003 Turkish television series debuts
2005 Turkish television series endings
 Show TV original programming
 Kanal D original programming
 Works about organized crime in Turkey